Shanice is the fourth studio album by American R&B singer Shanice. It was released on March 9, 1999 on LaFace Records. Produced by Dallas Austin, Babyface, Warryn Campbell, Laney Stewart, and others, the album peaked at number 56 on the US Billboard 200 and number 15 on the Top R&B/Hip-Hop Albums chart. The lead single, "When I Close My Eyes" held the record for the biggest leap in 1-week on the Billboard Hot 100 (from number 91 to number 16) until 2006 and peaked at number 12 on the US Hot 100. Other singles released from the album were "Yesterday" and "You Need a Man."

Critical reception

AllMusic editor Jose F. Promis found that the singer "possesses a powerful voice to be sure, and the songs on this set are pleasant enough, but one can't help but feel that this album possesses something of an assembly-line feel [...] Shanice has a strong voice and is a talented singer, but ultimately deserves more creative songwriting and better material, because one can't help but feel that her talent is wasted on this mindless, mass-produced '90s pop-soul borderline drudge."

Track listing

Charts

Release history

References

External links 
 

1999 albums
Shanice albums
Albums produced by Warryn Campbell
LaFace Records albums
Albums produced by Laney Stewart